Magadi Puttarudriah  (16 December 1903 – 12 December 1983) was an Indian entomologist who worked in the Government of Mysore and after 1957 in the Government of Karnataka. He was the first professor of entomology at the University of Agricultural Sciences, Bangalore created in 1964.

Puttarudriah was born in Magadi in a farming family and obtained his BSc from Central College, Bangalore in 1932. He then worked in the Department of Agriculture as part of a scheme to study fish poisons and the potential for their use as pesticides. He was later posted to study the coffee white stem borer Xylotrechus quadripes in Chikmagalur becoming in charge of enforcing control measures against the pest between 1940 and 1944. He was deputed to study at the University of California, Berkeley, obtaining his MS (1949) and PhD (1951) as a student of Ray Fred Smith. His MS research was on the biological control of the alfalfa looper in California and PhD work on the biology of Heliothis phloxiphaga. He returned in 1951 and joined the department of agriculture and also served as a professor of entomology in the newly created University of Agricultural Sciences in 1964. He also served as a director of instruction and as principal before he retired in 1971. His studies were influenced by Paul DeBach and tended to avoid chemical measures favouring biological control and cultural practices in management. He produced one of the first and most influential guides to pest protection for crops written in Kannada. 

Along with G.P. Channabasavanna and others he discovered the existence of the ladybird Cryptolaemus montrouzieri in large numbers on Araucaria in Bangalore in July 1951 and noted that although it had been introduced in India in 1898 to control mealybugs, it had been recorded as not having established. He identified an eriophyid mite causing bunching of leaves in mangoes. The bunchy top symptom had been confused with mango malformation which was also caused by eriophyid mites and noted before by M.J. Narasimhan. He examined ladybird predators and hymenopteran parasites that could be used in the Mysore region. In 1955 he made an attempt to list all the known insects and mite species of Mysore state.

References

External links 
 ಬೆಳೆಕೀಟಗಳು ಮತ್ತು ಅವುಗಳ ಹತೋಟಿ (1977) [The first major Kannada work on crop protection from pests]
 Other editions and extracts

Indian entomologists
1903 births
1983 deaths
University of California, Berkeley alumni